Irina Igorevna Ologonova is a Russian wrestler of Buryat descent.

In 2022, she competed at the Yasar Dogu Tournament held in Istanbul, Turkey.

References

External links
 Upsets Mark First Day of Female Wrestling - 2014 WWC

Videos
 World Championship 2014 - Final

Buryat sportspeople
Russian female sport wrestlers
Living people
Wrestlers at the 2015 European Games
European Games competitors for Russia
World Wrestling Championships medalists
Sportspeople from Buryatia
European Wrestling Championships medalists
1990 births
21st-century Russian women